Hurtle Vale is a single-member electoral district for the South Australian House of Assembly, located in the southern suburbs of Adelaide. It was created by the redistribution conducted in 2016, and was contested for the first time at the 2018 state election.

Hurtle Vale is a new electorate replacing the electoral district of Fisher. It is named after Sir James Hurtle Fisher, the same as its predecessor. Hurtle Vale is further southwest than Fisher was before the redistribution, with overlap only in the northeast of Hurtle Vale with the southwest of Fisher. At the time of the redistribution, 9000 electors from Fisher remained in Hurtle Vale. 10,000 moved with the suburb of Morphett Vale from Reynell and smaller numbers from Mawson and Mitchell.

At its creation, Hurtle Vale was projected to be notionally held by the Labor Party with a swing of 1.7% required to lose it. Nat Cook, who won Fisher at a by-election in 2014 for Labor, won Hurtle Vale at the 2018 election.

Geography 
At its creation, Hurtle Vale contained the suburbs of Old Reynella, Reynella East, Woodcroft as well as part of Happy Valley and Morphett Vale.

Members for Hurtle Vale

Election results

Notes

References
 ECSA profile for Hurtle Vale: 2018
 ABC profile for Hurtle Vale: 2018
 Poll Bludger profile for Hurtle Vale: 2018

Hurtle Vale